Žák (feminine Žáková) is a Czech surname meaning "pupil, disciple". Notable people with the surname include:

 Hana Žáková, Czech rower
 Ladislav Žák (1900–1973), Czech architect
 Robert Žák (born 1966), Czech football manager and former player

Czech-language surnames